Blue Ridge Dam is a hydroelectric dam on the Toccoa River in Fannin County, in the U.S. state of Georgia.  It is the uppermost of four dams on the Toccoa/Ocoee River owned and operated by the Tennessee Valley Authority.  The dam impounds the  Blue Ridge Lake on the southwestern fringe of the Blue Ridge Mountains.

Location
The Chattahoochee National Forest surrounds Blue Ridge Dam and its reservoir, and the city of Blue Ridge, Georgia is located a few miles west of the dam. U.S. Route 76 crosses a bridge just downstream from Blue Ridge Dam.

Capacity
A  surge tank relieves pressure brought about by rapid gate closures.

Seasonal releases from the dam create Class I and Class II rapids on the Toccoa River for several miles downstream.

History

Blue Ridge Dam was built by the Toccoa Electric Power Company, a subsidiary of the Tennessee Electric Power Company (TEPCO), which operated several hydroelectric plants in nearby Tennessee, including Ocoee Dam No. 1 and Ocoee Dam No. 2.  Construction began in 1925, and the dam went into operation July 1, 1931.  At the time of its completion, the dam had a generating capacity of 20 megawatts and was the most modern power dam in the TEPCO system, requiring a staff of just six employees. Subsequent upgrades have increased the dams generating capacity to 22 megawatts.

With the passage of the TVA Act in 1933, the Tennessee Valley Authority was given oversight of the Tennessee River watershed (which included the Toccoa River).  TEPCO challenged the constitutionality of the TVA Act in federal court, but the U.S. Supreme Court upheld the law in 1939, and TEPCO was forced to sell its assets to TVA for $78 million in August of that year. This sum included $5 million for Blue Ridge Dam.

Soon after the dam began operations in 1931, its penstock partially collapsed. To prevent this from happening again, TVA has significantly lowered the water level in the reservoir when it conducts periodic dam inspections (approximately once every five years), which require dewatering of the penstock. A project was initiated in 2010 to repair the penstock, stabilize the intake tower base, and repair and stabilize the upstream and downstream faces of the dam, thus eliminating the future need for severe reservoir drawdowns.

References

External links

Blue Ridge Reservoir — official TVA site

Dams on the Hiwassee River
Tennessee Valley Authority dams
Dams in Georgia (U.S. state)
Buildings and structures in Fannin County, Georgia
Dams completed in 1931
1931 establishments in Georgia (U.S. state)